Christoph Baumgartner (born 1 August 1999) is an Austrian professional footballer who plays as a midfielder for Bundesliga club 1899 Hoffenheim and the Austria national team.

Club career
In January 2019, Baumgartner was promoted to the first team squad of 1899 Hoffenheim. He made his debut for Hoffenheim in the Bundesliga on 11 May 2019, coming on as a half-time substitute for Nadiem Amiri in the 0–1 home loss against Werder Bremen.

International career

Youth
Baumgartner appeared for the various Austrian youth national teams, from the under-15 to under-19 selections. In April 2016, he was included in Austria's squad for the 2016 UEFA European Under-17 Championship in Azerbaijan. He scored both goals in Austria's 2–0 win in their opening match against Bosnia and Herzegovina, with the team managing to reach the quarter-finals before losing to Portugal.

He made his under-21 debut on 10 November 2017, coming on as a substitute for Mathias Honsak in the 87th minute of the 2019 UEFA European Under-21 Championship qualification match against Serbia, which finished as a 1–3 home loss.

Senior
On 21 June 2021, he scored the only goal for Austria in a 1–0 win over Ukraine in the UEFA Euro 2020, to help his national team to reach the knockout stages of the competition for the first time in their history.

Career statistics

Club

International

Scores and results list Austria's goal tally first, score column indicates score after each Baumgartner goal.

Personal life
Baumgartner's older brother, Dominik, is also a professional footballer and youth international for Austria.

References

External links
 
 
 
 ÖFB profile
 National team statistics

1999 births
Living people
People from Horn, Austria
Footballers from Lower Austria
Austrian footballers
Austria youth international footballers
Austria under-21 international footballers
Austria international footballers
Association football midfielders
TSG 1899 Hoffenheim II players
TSG 1899 Hoffenheim players
Bundesliga players
Regionalliga players
UEFA Euro 2020 players
Austrian expatriate footballers
Austrian expatriate sportspeople in Germany
Expatriate footballers in Germany